Hyposmocoma trimaculata is a species of moth of the family Cosmopterigidae. It was first described by Lord Walsingham in 1907. It is endemic to the Hawaiian island of Oahu. The type locality is the Waianae Range.

The larvae probably feed on lichen on and beneath the bark of Acacia koa and Aleurites moluccanus.

The larva forms a short subcylindrical case, constricted near each end and covered with minute bits of lichen.

External links

trimaculata
Endemic moths of Hawaii
Moths described in 1907
Taxa named by Thomas de Grey, 6th Baron Walsingham